The nasal spine (spina nasalis) may refer to:
Anterior nasal spine (spina nasalis anterior maxillae)
Posterior nasal spine (spina nasalis posterior ossis palatini)